Raymond Thomas Bedore (November 14, 1924 – August 27, 2012), better known as Tom Bedore, was an American football end in the National Football League for the Washington Redskins. He was born in Faust, New York on November 14, 1924, and attended Pepperdine University. Bedore died on August 27, 2012, at the age of 87.

References

External links
NFL History – Champion and Award Lists
Tom Bedore – Profile at Pro Football Archives

1924 births
2012 deaths
American football tight ends
People from Franklin County, New York
Pepperdine University alumni
Washington Redskins players